Onni Kasslin (27 February 1927 – 9 August 2003) was a Finnish cyclist. He competed at the 1948 and 1952 Summer Olympics.

References

External links
 

1927 births
2003 deaths
Finnish male cyclists
Olympic cyclists of Finland
Cyclists at the 1948 Summer Olympics
Cyclists at the 1952 Summer Olympics
Sportspeople from Vantaa